Tecnophilus croceicollis is a species of ground beetle in the family Carabidae. It is found in Central America and North America.

Subspecies
These two subspecies belong to the species Tecnophilus croceicollis:
 Tecnophilus croceicollis croceicollis (Ménétriés, 1843)
 Tecnophilus croceicollis peigani Larson, 1969

References

Further reading

 

Harpalinae
Articles created by Qbugbot
Beetles described in 1843